Dianeura goochii is a species of moth of the Anomoeotidae family. It is known from South Africa.

References

Endemic moths of South Africa
Anomoeotidae
Moths of Africa